The Miss Ecuador 2001 contest was held on March 22, 2001. There were 13 candidates for the national title, the crown passed from Carolina Alfonso from Pichincha to Jéssica Bermúdez from Guayas, but the new Miss Ecuador 2001 was crowned by Ximena Aulestia who was the 1st Runner-up at Miss Ecuador 1969 and competed at Miss World 1969. Jéssica competed at Miss Universe 2001.

Results

Placements

Special awards

Contestants

Notes

Returns
Last competed in:
1999
 Chimborazo

Withdraws

 Azuay
 Esmeraldas
 Imbabura
 Loja

External links
https://web.archive.org/web/20120725044759/http://www.missecuador.net/home/index.php?option=com_content&task=view&id=88&Itemid=52

http://www.eluniverso.com/2002/03/26/0001/257/EA85C60C54DA4F15B196C6C76F6EDD56.html
http://www.eluniverso.com/2002/03/27/0001/257/F9E0E9ECA4B1464FA1CFD538B252D246.html
http://www.geocities.ws/fotitos2000/Nomina.html

Miss Ecuador
2001 beauty pageants
Beauty pageants in Ecuador
2001 in Ecuador